Naukova is a station on Kharkiv Metro's Oleksiivska Line.

History 
The station was opened on May 6, 1995. The project is called "Lenin Avenue" which is also the name of a major and popular road in Kharkiv. It was named "Nauchnaya" - which means "Scientific" because of the large number of educational institutions and research institutes in the area of exits from the station.

Before the launch of the second stage of the Alekseevskaya line on August 21, 2004, it was the terminal station, and also near the entrance to the metro there was a terminal stop for trolleybuses (mines No. 8, No. 38), (No. 2 - Unfolded on Danilevsky Street). After the opening of the metro stations "Botanichesky Sad", "23 August", "Alekseevskaya", "Pobeda" route 2 was extended to Alekseevka, routes 8 and 38 were canceled.

Description 
It has a column-type station, shallow, with two lobbies. The bunk, and second floor balconies are supported by columns. Balconies and columns are faced with white marble. The walls around the train tracks are brown.

Naukova also called Nauchnaya is one of the three stations of the Kharkiv metro line with a two-tiered hall (similar to the Universitet and Pobeda stations). Access to the second floor is from the metro workers' lobbies, on both sides there are service rooms.

Two notable establishments around this metro station are the Kharkiv National University of Radioelectronics and a popular McDonald's eatery in the city.

External links
 

Kharkiv Metro stations
Railway stations opened in 1995